The Sharjah Light Festival (SLF) is a cultural extravaganza that takes place annually in the Emirate of Sharjah, United Arab Emirates. The festival was first established in 2010 under the patronage of His Highness Sheikh Dr. Sultan bin Muhammad Al Qasimi, Member of the Supreme Council and Ruler of Sharjah, and has since become an integral part of the city's cultural landscape.

The SLF showcases the synergy of Sharjah's beautiful architecture, cultural heritage, and light, attracting hundreds of thousands of visitors every year who come to see the stunning illuminations of the city's iconic landmarks. The festival takes visitors on a tour of cultural heights, fusing all the components of beauty, art, culture, education, innovation, and higher thinking into one magnificent event.

Locations
Thirteen landmarks and locations in Sharjah will be illuminated as part of the festival.They are following.

University City Hall
Al Noor Mosque
Khalid Lagoon Corniche
Al Majaz Waterfront
Sharjah Fort
Al Hamriyah Municipality building
Al Dhaid Fort
Al Rafisah Dam in Khorfakkan
Kalba Clock Tower
Sheikh Rashid bin Ahmed Al Qasimi Mosque in Dibba Al Hisn
the Headquarters of the Beeah Group
The Light Village.

References 

Emirate of Sharjah